DBU Copenhagen is the local governing body for association football and futsal in Copenhagen, Denmark. They are responsible for the governance and development of men's and women's football at all levels in the region. DBU Copenhagen is a member of the union of local football associations, DBU Bredde, under the Danish Football Association (DBU) and the National Olympic Committee and Sports Confederation of Denmark (DIF). The headquarters is located at the Svanemølleanlægget at Østerbro after previously having their residence at the national football stadium. Clubs situated in the municipalities of Copenhagen, Frederiksberg, Gentofte, Tårnby and Dragør can be accepted as members of DBU Copenhagen. Due to historical reasons a number of older clubs from other municipalities are also member of the association. As per 2020, the association consisted of 157 clubs and 45,627 members with the Østerbro-based club BK Skjold being the largest club membership-wise within the association and on a national level.

Founded in 1903 as Kjøbenhavns Boldspil-Union (KBU), the spelling was changed in 1936 to Københavns Boldspil-Union. Its current name was adopted on 1 February 2011. The regional football association publishes a magazine Fodboldmagasinet København. It has four annual issues and is published in 3,500 copies. The magazine was revived in January 2005 (first edition was released in week 6) after a couple of years without a members magazine or football magazine focusing on association football in Copenhagen and related topics. Between 2005 and 2016, the publication was named Københavnsk Fodbold, until it was renamed in 2017.

History

Previously, the clubs based in the Copenhagen area were directly members of the national football association, but at a DBU general meeting in 1903, Jutland Football Association (JBU) and the dominating Copenhagen clubs agreed to change the association's bylaws, so that the Danish Football Association in practice would change their name to Københavns Boldspil-Union, while a new Danish Football Association was formed, transferring all assets and liabilities except for the right to publication of the laws for football and cricket including the cash holdings. The Danish Football Association, who had previously been an organization for Copenhagen, would now become a real national organization, while KBU would take over the football administration for Copenhagen. The 10 Copenhagen clubs, that were members of the association at that time, would become the first members of the new Copenhagen Football Association: Akademisk BK, Kjøbenhavns BK, B.93, BK Frem, KFUM København, Østerbros BK, BK Athenae, BK Lydia, BK Olympia and Frederiksberg BK. At the foundation on 29 April 1903, the association was named Kjøbenhavns Boldspil-Union (KBU), the spelling was changed in 1936 to Københavns Boldspil-Union and on 1 February 2011, a new name (DBU København) and logo was adopted as a direct result of the market review conducted by the Danish FA a few years earlier, while the previous name was kept as a secondary name.

In 1906, Fælledklubbernes Boldspil-Union (FBU) merged with Kjøbenhavns Boldspil-Union, when they realized that a cooperation was necessary with regard to the future plans for Fælledparken. The football associations in the surrounding areas, Amager Boldspil-Union (founded 1912), Nordre Birks Boldspil-Union (founded 1913), Valby Boldspil-Union (founded 1913) and Nørrebro Boldspil-Union (founded 1916), merged to form Københavns Forstadsklubbers Bold Union (KFBU) in 1916 and after intense negotiations, KFBU eventually became a provisional member of KBU and ultimately in the period spanning from 1921 to 1923 the clubs from the football associations of Amager, Valby and Nørrebro became full members of KBU, while the clubs of Nordre Birk became members of Zealand Football Association (SBU).

As a consequence of the capital's increasing development and growth at the end of World War I, disagreement between the Zealand FA and KBU arose regarding the membership of clubs located at the border between the two football associations. The most general views was that clubs playing in the metropolitan area of Copenhagen should be members of KBU, while clubs in the northern part of the metropolitan area, Nordre Birk (Gentofte, Gladsaxe and Lyngby-Tårbæk) should be members of SBU. In 1945, a border agreement was signed, so KBU included clubs based in Copenhagen, Frederiksberg, Gentofte, Tårnby and Dragør, while all other clubs would become members of SBU unless they had always been members of KBU. This border agreement was formalized in 1971. This resulted in some unclear results and as a direct consequence of Akademisk Boldklub being forced to switch their membership from KBU and SBU on 1 January 1962, the agreement was temporarily terminated by KBU effective at the end of 1965, even though SBU did not accept the termination.

The organization's first residence was an office in the 'Fælledklubhuset' on the other side of the grand stand, that was part of Københavns Idrætspark. The official address was later moved to Østerbrogade, on top of the Park restaurant, before moving back to the national stadium's old north stand. The offices of the administration remained here for 40 years until moving to B.93's building at Svanemølleanlægget on 1 March 1996 due to issues with paying the yearly rent of DKK 150,000 in the newly rebuilt Parken stadium. On 17 August 2021, the represensatives at DBU København voted against a merger with DBU Sjælland, DBU Lolland-Falster and DBU Bornholm to create an eastern regional football organization as part of the reform process of the grassroots organization of DBU Bredde.

Logos
In February 2011, the regional football association changed its name alongside its logo. Overview of former logos and the current:

Competitions

As of 2016, the football association administers the local men's senior leagues at level 5 in the Danish football league system besides women's and youth football. The top league at the local senior men's level under the football association's administration is called Københavnsserien and was regarded as level 1 in Danish football between 1903 and 1913. Before the national "knockout" cup competition, DBU Pokalen, was introduced in 1954, the football association had its own regional cup competitions known as KBUs Pokalturnering, Sommerpokalturneringen and B-rækkens Pokalturnering, which were all contested in various periods between 1910 and 1953. Clubs playing at the lower leagues participate in qualification rounds for the first round of DBU Pokalen.

Senior Men's
 Leagues
 Københavnsserien
 Serie 1
 Serie 2
 Serie 3
 Serie 4
 Serie 5
 Futsal Københavnsserien
 Cups
 Qualification for DBU Pokalen

Senior Women's
 Leagues
 Kvinde-Københavnsserien
 Serie 1
 Serie 2
 Kvinde Futsal Københavnsserien
 Cups
 Qualification for DBU Kvindepokalen

Defunct
 KBUs Pokalturnering (1910–1953) for the highest ranking KBU clubs
 Baneklubberne Tournaments (1911) for the field-owning KBU clubs
 Sommerpokalturneringen (1931–1946) for KBU tier 2 clubs
 B-rækkens Pokalturnering (1933–1946) for KBU tier 3 clubs

List of chairpersons
A total of 18 different persons have been chairman for DBU Copenhagen.

 1903–1911: Jørgen Jensen, Kjøbenhavns BK
 1911–1912: Johannes Forschammer, Akademisk BK
 1912–1914: Thorsten Larsen, Akademisk BK
 1914–1919: Peter Nicholaj Holst, B.93
 1919–1925: Kristian Middelboe, Kjøbenhavns BK
 1925–1931: Leo Frederiksen, Akademisk BK
 1931–1945: Svend Berendt, B.93
 1945–1946: Ivar Lykke, Kjøbenhavns BK
 1946–1948: Edvin Hansen, Akademisk BK
 1948–1954: Kurt Nielsen, BK Frem
 1954–1970: Oscar Olsen, BK Mariendal
 1970–1978: Erik Rasmussen, Brønshøj BK
 1978–1992: Kjeld Hjorth, BK Skjold
 1992–2006: Torben Mogensen, Gentofte-Vangede IF
 2006–2017: Henrik Ravnild, BK Union
 2017–2020: Christian Kofoed, B 1903
 2020–2021: Jesper Gradert, Hellerup IK
 2021–present: Flemming Jensen, Nørrebro United

Footnotes

References

External links
 

Copenhagen
Organizations based in Copenhagen
Sports organizations established in 1903
1903 establishments in Denmark
Sport in Copenhagen